The 1937 San Francisco Dons football team was an American football team that represented the University of San Francisco as an independent during the 1937 college football season. In their first season under head coach George Malley, the Dons compiled a 4–5–1 record and were outscored by their opponents by a combined total of 85 to 48.

Schedule

References

San Francisco
San Francisco Dons football seasons
San Francisco Dons football